This list of human rights awards is an index to articles about notable awards given for the promotion of human rights. 
These are moral principles or social norms that describe certain standards of human behaviour and are regularly protected as natural and legal rights in municipal and international law.
The list is organized by region and country of the main sponsoring organizations, but many of the awards are open to people or organizations from other countries and regions.

International

Africa

Americas

Canada

United States

Asia

Europe

Oceania

See also
Lists of awards

References

 
Human rights